Science Fictions: How Fraud, Bias, Negligence, and Hype Undermine the Search for Truth is a 2020 non-fiction book on issues undermining scientific research by Scottish psychologist Stuart J. Ritchie. It was published by Metropolitan Books on July 14, 2020 and is Ritchie's second book. Science Fictions was nominated for the £25,000 Royal Society Prize for Science Books but lost out to Merlin Sheldrake's Entangled Life.

Summary

In Science Fictions, Ritchie argues that modern scientific research suffers from a number of issues – including outright fraud; publication bias and human bias; negligence and error; and sensationalism through media hype – that undermine its ability to be objective and accurate. He describes methodological issues involved in the replication crisis, such as p-hacking, as well as broader systemic issues, such as perverse incentives in the peer review process and the problem of null results being difficult or impossible to publish, leading to under-reporting of many important findings. He also details the ways in which technology such as Photoshop has made it easier for researchers to commit subtle but serious fraud. 

Throughout the book, Ritchie offers examples of egregious fraud in scientific research, such as the misleading studies on trachea replacement published by Paolo Macchiarini that led to his patients dying and was covered up for years by the institutions supporting the research. But he also points out less obvious, pervasive fraud – for example, a survey that found evidence of manipulated images in 4% of the 20,000 scientific papers analyzed. He argues that even well-intentioned researchers can be tempted to over-hype their results or repeat experiments until they receive the result they wanted simply by the desire to gain fame or advance their career. In the final chapter, Ritchie offers possible solutions for improving the methodology, incentives, and outcomes of scientific research, such as encouraging researchers to pre-register their work to avoid the temptation to alter their conclusions to fit the outcome, and using technology to identify common errors that can creep into and distort statistical analysis.

Reception

The book received largely positive reviews. Kirkus Reviews called it a "timely, hair-raising must-read." Christie Aschwanden of Wired praised the book for being "a highly readable and competent description of the problems facing researchers in the 21st century" and "an excellent primer for anyone who wants to understand why and how science is failing to live up to its ideals." In 2021, the book was short-listed for the Royal Society Prizes for Science Books.

Fiona Fidler, writing in Nature, praised the book's call to action to the scientific community to reckon with the issues Ritchie raises, but argued that the book "rests too heavily on the idea that there were once golden days when science was a pure truth-seeking enterprise."

References 

2020 non-fiction books
Metropolitan Books books
Science books